The Indiana Volunteer Infantry is a military organization organized from citizens or residents of the U.S. state of Indiana.

Individual organizations that have been part of the Indiana Volunteer Infantry include:

 1st Indiana Volunteers
 5th Indiana Volunteers
 6th Indiana Infantry Regiment
 7th Indiana Infantry Regiment
 8th Indiana Infantry Regiment
 9th Indiana Infantry Regiment
 11th Indiana Infantry Regiment
 13th Indiana Infantry Regiment
 18th Indiana Infantry Regiment
 19th Indiana Infantry Regiment, the "Iron Brigade"
 20th Indiana Infantry Regiment
 22nd Indiana Infantry Regiment
 23rd Indiana Infantry Regiment
 24th Indiana Infantry Regiment
 25th Indiana Infantry Regiment
 26th Indiana Infantry Regiment
 27th Indiana Infantry Regiment
 29th Indiana Infantry Regiment
 30th Indiana Infantry Regiment
 32nd Indiana Infantry Regiment, the "1st German"
 33rd Indiana Infantry Regiment
 35th Indiana Infantry Regiment
 2nd Regiment Indiana Cavalry, the "41st Indiana Infantry"
 42nd Indiana Infantry Regiment
 43rd Indiana Infantry Regiment
 44th Indiana Infantry Regiment
 47th Indiana Infantry Regiment
 48th Indiana Infantry Regiment
 97th Indiana Infantry Regiment
 99th Indiana Infantry Regiment
 101st Indiana Infantry Regiment

Military in Indiana